The 2012 United Football League Cup was the fourth edition of the United Football League Cup that ran from September 15 to December 17, 2012. This edition consisted of 28 teams which separated into four groups of five.

Starting this edition, there were 2 stages in the competition. The first stage competed between UFL Division 2 teams and guest teams, while the second stage included UFL Division 1 teams. The top 10 teams of the Cup moved to the knockout stage of the 2013 PFF National Men's Club Championship.

Philippine Air Force were the defending champions.

On December 17, 2012, Stallion defeated Global with a 2–1 scoreline to win their first ever UFL Cup.

Stage 1
This edition saw entry of nine clubs: Mondoñedo Internacionale FC, International FC Philippines, General Trias International FC, Sta. Lucia Mustangs FC, Primero Atletico Cavite FC, Blue Guards FC, Bright Star FC, Mendiola FC 1991 and FC Masbate. These clubs must beat UFL 2nd Division clubs twice to advance to Stage 2. Once a Division Two team beats a guest club the latter will be out of the competition.

All times are Philippine Standard Time (PST) – UTC+8.

Teams advancing from Stage One will join UFL’s Division One teams in the group-stage draw. The draw was held on September 28, 2012.

Stage 2
Clubs qualified from Stage 1
Team Socceroo
Dolphins United
Mendiola FC 1991
Sta. Lucia Mustangs FC
Laos FC
Forza FC
General Trias International FC
Agila

UFL Division 1 Clubs qualified for Stage 2
Global
Kaya
Loyola
Stallion
Air Force
Pasargad
Nomads
Green Archers United
Army
Pachanga

UFL Division 2 Clubs qualified for Stage 2
Navy
Diliman

All times are Philippine Standard Time (PST) – UTC+8.

Group A

Group B

Group C

Group D

Ranking of group third placed teams
The two best third place teams among all groups qualify for 2013 PFF National Men's Club Championship.  They are determined by the parameters in this order:
 Highest number of points
 Goal difference
 Highest number of goals scored (goals for)

Knockout stage

Quarter-finals

Semi-finals

The Third-place playoff and Finals matches were originally scheduled on November 19 at the Rizal Memorial Stadium, but were postponed on a later date, since some players playing for the clubs are on national duty as members of the Philippine national team competing in the 2012 AFF Suzuki Cup. The actual date depended on how the national team fared in the international tournament. As the national team only reached the semi-finals, the matches were scheduled on December 17.

Third-place playoff

Final

Top goalscorers
Top Goal Scorers starting Stage 2 of the 2012 United Football Cup

Correct as of 11:00, December 18, 2012
Source: 2012 UFL Cup Goals

Awards
The following were the competition’s top individual awardees.

Golden Gloves:  Wilson Munoz (Stallion)
Golden Boot:  Phil Younghusband (Loyola)
Golden Ball:  Ruben Doctora Jr. (Stallion)

Notes

References

External links 

2012 domestic association football cups
United Football League Cup seasons
Cup